In the Netherlands the word Kloosterkerk or monasterium refers to a church that is or was connected to a monastery. Examples include:
Kloosterkerk, The Hague
Kloosterkerk, Assen
Munsterkerk (at Roermond)